Physetocneme is a genus of moths in the subfamily Arctiinae. It contains the single species Physetocneme ciliosa, which is found on Ambon Island.

References

Natural History Museum Lepidoptera generic names catalog

Lithosiini